1823 Gliese, provisional designation , is a stony Flora asteroid from the inner regions of the asteroid belt, approximately 8 kilometers in diameter. It was discovered on 4 September 1951, by German astronomer Karl Reinmuth at Heidelberg Observatory in southern Germany. The asteroid was named after German astronomer Wilhelm Gliese.

Orbit and classification 

The S-type asteroid is a member of the Flora family, one of the largest groups of stony asteroids in the main-belt. It orbits the Sun in the inner main-belt at a distance of 1.9–2.5 AU once every 3 years and 4 months (1,213 days). Its orbit has an eccentricity of 0.14 and an inclination of 3° with respect to the ecliptic. The first used precovery was taken at the discovering Heidelberg observatory in 1950, extending the asteroid's observation arc by one year prior to its official discovery.

Physical characteristics

Rotation period 

A rotational lightcurve of this asteroid was obtained from photometric observations made by Czech astronomer Petr Pravec at the Ondřejov Observatory in August 2014. The lightcurve gave a well-defined rotation period of  hours with a brightness variation of 0.27 in magnitude. One month later, in September 2014, a second lightcurve by American astronomer Brian Warner at his Palmer Divide Observatory, Colorado, gave a concurring period of  hours with an amplitude of 0.23 in magnitude.

Diameter and albedo 

According to the survey carried out by the NEOWISE mission of NASA's space-based Wide-field Infrared Survey Explorer, the asteroid measures 8.4 and 9.5 kilometers in diameter and its surface has an albedo of 0.189 and 0.135, respectively, while the Collaborative Asteroid Lightcurve Link assumes an albedo of 0.24 – derived from 8 Flora, the largest member and namesake of this asteroid's orbital family – and calculates a diameter of 8.2 kilometers with an absolute magnitude of 12.6.

Naming 

This minor planet was named after German astronomer Wilhelm Gliese (1915–1993) at the Astronomisches Rechen-Institut. Gliese is widely known for having compiled about 1,000 stars located within 25 parsecs of Earth into the Gliese Catalogue of Nearby Stars. The official  was published by the Minor Planet Center on 18 April 1977. A large number of Exoplanets derive their names form this star catalogue.

Notes

References

External links 
 Gliese Catalogue of Nearby Stars, Heidelberg University
  
 Asteroid Lightcurve Database (LCDB), query form (info )
 Dictionary of Minor Planet Names, Google books
 Asteroids and comets rotation curves, CdR – Observatoire de Genève, Raoul Behrend
 Discovery Circumstances: Numbered Minor Planets (1)-(5000) – Minor Planet Center
 
 

001823
Discoveries by Karl Wilhelm Reinmuth
Named minor planets
19510904